The 1988 Stanford Cardinal football team represented Stanford University in the 1988 NCAA Division I-A football season. This was Jack Elway's last season as head coach. He was fired following a disappointing season.

Schedule

Personnel

Game summaries

Southern California

San Diego State

at Oregon

at Notre Dame

San Jose State

Arizona State

Oregon State

at Washington

Washington State

at UCLA

at California

Stanford's Tuan Van Le, a Vietnam War refugee, blocked Robbie Keen's 20-yard field goal in the final seconds to preserve the tie.

Radio

Some games broadcast on KYA–FM 93.3 because of broadcast conflict with the Oakland Athletics

References

Stanford
Stanford Cardinal football seasons
Stanford Cardinal football